The Emirate of Harar was a Muslim kingdom founded in 1647 when the Harari people refused to accept Imām ʿUmardīn Ādan as their ruler and broke away from the Imamate of Aussa to form their own state under `Ali ibn Da`ud. The city of Harar Gey served as its sole capital. Prior to its invasion by Shewan forces under Menelik II, the League of Nations noted that the Harar kingdom made up the area between the rivers Awash and Shebelle while the Ogaden was a tributary state. Originally however the Harar Emirate composed of present-day Somalia and to south of eastern Ethiopia including the Arsi Province. 

Harar also dominated trade in Shewa. Harar's influence began shrinking in the nineteenth century possibly due to lack of resources and famine. Like all Muslim states in the area, the Emirate of Harar was technically under the protection of the Ottoman Empire. Egypt annexed the Emirate of Harar in 1875. The British Empire defeated the Khedivate and occupied its territories in 1882 including Harar, but the British agreed to evacuate Harar and essentially cede the city to the Ethiopian Empire's sphere of influence in exchange for assistance against Mahdist forces in Sudan. As per the terms of their agreement (the Hewett Treaty), the British withdrew from Harar in 1884, leaving the city to the son of the former Emir of Harar with a few hundred rifles, some cannon and a handful of British trained officers.  The Emirate would be finally destroyed and annexed by the armies of Negus Sahle Maryam of Shewa (the future Emperor Menelik II) in 1887 following the Emirate's defeat at the Battle of Chelenqo.

Emirs of Harar (Dawud Dynasty)

See also
Sultanate of Harar
Egyptian invasion of the Eastern Horn of Africa
 Walashma Dynasty

References

Further reading
Avishai Ben-Dror (2018): "Emirate, Egyptian, Ethiopian: Colonial Experiences in Late Nineteenth-Century Harar"

History of Ethiopia
1647 establishments in Africa
1887 disestablishments in Africa
Geography of the Ottoman Empire
Vassal states of the Ottoman Empire
Former monarchies